Adoxophyes liberatrix is a species of moth of the family Tortricidae. It is found on Christmas Island, a territory of Australia in the Indian Ocean.

References

Moths described in 1947
Adoxophyes
Moths of Australia